Norfolk County in the Canadian province of Ontario consists of a long list of communities. Its four designated population centres are Simcoe, Port Dover, Delhi, and Waterford.
 The population of the County at the time of the 2016 Census was 64,044. Of that number, 13,922 live in the community of Simcoe.

In the late 1900s, the county was merged with Haldimand County but the merged entity was dissolved in 2000 and this area became The Town of the County of Norfolk.

Communities

A–M

Andy's Corners
Andy's Corners is a small community that is between Wyecombe and Carholme in Norfolk County.

Agriculture is the dominant industry and commerce consists of a variety store and a place to buy Volvo automobiles to the east of the hamlet. Most of the clients who buy automobiles from the local Volvo dealership are tobacco farmers and their families. Only Pepsi soft drinks are served at the general store and the population is less than 30 people. The nearest town with a shopping mall is Tillsonburg about 15–30 minutes to the northwest. Delhi is to the northeast. High school children here go to Valley Heights Secondary School while elementary school students go to Langton Public School.

The town's only intersection offers a facilitated way to get to Lynedoch, Silver Hill, Pinegrove, and Delhi.

Atherton
Atherton is a hamlet in Norfolk County that is in between Gilbertville and Simcoe. The population of Atherton is less than 100 people and there are no sidewalks in the hamlet. The tiny community can be found by exploring on Highway 3 as well as Lynedoch Road which is the other major road that goes into Atherton.

The manufacturing plant is located north of Walsh, northeast of Pine Grove, and southeast of Delhi. The hamlet is a farming community with little or no commerce in the area.

Bill's Corners
Bill's Corners is a hamlet in Norfolk County that is between Green's Corners and Hillcrest. Further to the east is the town of Simcoe, which is the closest town to Bill's Corners.

The sole industry in the hamlet is agriculture; abortive attempts were made to have a garage for automobile repair during the 1990s and early 2000s. The hamlet has a population of fewer than 200 people. Walsh Public School provides education for grades JK-8, and Simcoe Composite School provides secondary education. Bill's Corners was one of the last communities in Norfolk County to receive broadband access. A group of local citizens tried to fight this service but failed when Norfolk County council allowed the infrastructure to be installed in Bill's Corners anyway. As of 2014, nobody has petitioned Norfolk County council to remove broadband Internet service from Bill's Corners.

One famous previous resident was Dwayne Roloson, who played for six different teams before retiring from the National Hockey League. Roloson currently serves as a goaltending consultant within the Anaheim Ducks organization for the Norfolk Admirals (Norfolk, Virginia).

Blayney

Blayney is a hamlet in Norfolk County that is in between Pine Grove and Green's Corners. Established prior to 1920, it is considered to be one of Norfolk County's lost hamlets. It once hosted its own post office and general store before they were burnt down sometime after 1920.

There is no commerce and the cultivation of tobacco is the main industry. The hamlet is formed on the crossroads of Yuell Road and Regional Road 1 (known locally as McDowell Road). On Yuell Road South, there is a house that is almost completely underground. To the northwest is Delhi and to the southeast is Walsh.

The nearest gas station is in Pine Grove. Groceries, toiletries, and clothing are purchased from either Simcoe, Delhi, or Tillsonburg. Stores located near Blayney are Wal-Mart, Giant Tiger, Food Basics, Real Canadian Superstore and Sobeys.

Rick Danko, a musician and founding member of The Band, has a historical plaque dedicated to him near his childhood home. He performed on a 4-string tenor banjo shortly after entering grade 1. As a child, Danko was hyperactive, but was diagnosed in an era before Ritalin became mainstream.

Bloomsburg
Bloomsburg is a hamlet in Norfolk County which can be found on the old Ontario provincial Highway 24 that turns off from the "new" Ontario Provincial Highway 24 just 1.5 miles (CONVERT) north of Simcoe. Bloomsburg is the home of Bloomsburg Public School which is for primary, junior, and senior students (kindergarten through eighth grade). There is no commerce in this hamlet and the only industry is agriculture.

Booth's Harbour
Booth's Harbour is a community in Norfolk County. There is a historic harbor present which is named after a man named Booth who was one of the earliest settlers in the area. The village was founded in the 19th century. Booth's Harbour is located near Lake Erie, just across the bay from Long Point. Fishing and boating are productive summer pastimes here along with swimming and exploring the harbour.

Boston

Boston is an unincorporated area in Norfolk County. Agriculture is the main industry and commerce is limited. It is located northeast of the town of Simcoe. There is also a kindergarten-to-grade 8 school, Boston Public School, in the town. Boston Baptist Church, located on one of the four corners, recently celebrated its 212th anniversary. Just outside Boston, The Boston Common, a small casual dining restaurant thrives with business. The town has many small businesses including a convenience store, a mechanics shop, a hairdressing parlour, a cut-your-own Christmas tree lot, and a cabinetry shop.

Clear Creek
Clear Creek is a hamlet in southwestern Norfolk County. Although people live there and own real estate, the hamlet is legally described as agriculture land, not residential land to reduce property taxes.

Approximately 70 people live in this town amongst the 140 houses. About 9 of the houses have been abandoned due to safety issues from the wind turbines. People have lived in this community as far back as 1901 with some Canadian soldiers from the First World War having been raised in this community.

There are no sidewalks for safer pedestrian walking and wind turbines are seen very frequently within the vicinity of Clear Creek; being installed in November 2008.

Norfolk County has banned the placement of new wind turbines after becoming a "willing host" for them back in 2003. One of the council members were worried about Norfolk County becoming "industrialized" and "unnatural." Many leaders in Norfolk County envision the county as being an agricultural hub for Southern Ontario even by the middle of the 22nd century. The nearest high school is Valley Heights Secondary School which is to the northeast. Students from here grab the same high school bus as the students from Houghton.

Courtland

Courtland is a village located in Norfolk County on Highway 3 between Delhi and Tillsonburg. This community was once known as Middleton; named after the more well-known community of Middleton in Nova Scotia. The first settler was Lot Tisdale who arrived in 1823. 917 people live here as of 2009. A 30-hectare certified organic herb farm owned by Garry Proven operates in the area.

By the year 2020, Courtland will experience cable television and Internet speeds that are roughly comparable to Delhi's Internet speeds thanks to an underground cable system that will hook up communities like Langton, Port Rowan, and St. Williams into the world of reliable broadband Internet.

To the west of the town is a motorcycle shop and a gas station that was once owned by UPI Energy. North Street is the oldest street in the village which runs parallel with the railroad tracks. There are five churches in the village, the oldest being the Lutheran Church. Main Street is the street that has the most commerce and Highway Crescent offers a passageway from the highway for the local residents. In the eastern part of the village, a cul-de-sac community called Talbot Court is being constructed.

Sidewalks only exist on the main streets. Otherwise, the walk through Courtland is simple provided that pedestrians pay extra caution to the traffic on the street. Flat terrain exists throughout the entire village; and the village spans approximately 5 kilometres. Recommended activities are hiking, running, and walking. The usage of ATVs, motorcycles, and bicycles are not recommended due to safety concerns. Unlike most communities in Norfolk County, Courtland is entirely accessible for wheelchair users.

The full extent of the service industry in Courtland includes a variety store, an antique store, a "bread and pastries" type of bakery which has been operating in the community since 1939, a family restaurant and a flower shop. Courtland Vinyl Windows and Gopher Dunes are a couple of well-known businesses in the area. A golf course was once located here; it closed on October 16, 2003, due to factors caused by the early 2000s recession. Official tax policy changes made after the 2003 Ontario provincial election worsened the local poverty rate and made people less likely to enjoy golf as a recreational sport.

There are also two schools in Courtland; one being a public school and other being a part of the Catholic school system.

Delhi

Delhi (pronounced DEL-High) is located off of the junction of Hwy 59 and 3 and is known as the Heart of Tobacco Country.

The settlement was founded by Frederick Sovereign (or Sovereign) who built a cabin here in about 1812. At the time, the area was heavily treed and would become important in the lumber industry. The village was named Sovereign's Corners (or Sovereign's Corners) and later Fredericksburg until the post office opened as Delhi in 1856. Sovereign was a tavern keeper for over 30 years. He also manufactured plug tobacco, growing his own leaves, curing them, and pressing them. He donated the land for the Baptist church and served as deacon for "many, many years".

The population in 1869 was 300 and the village had some manufacturing as well as a lumber mill thanks to the abundant water power. The post office was receiving mail daily. The railway arrived in the 1870s a definite benefit to locals who opened business such as the Delhi Canning Company, established in 1878; the company shipped canned local produce across Canada.

The village initially had a log schoolhouse but a new school was built in 1892. 
By around 1900, the village had an opera house, two tanneries, a railroad station, an Orange Hall and a Mechanics' Institute as well as a flour mill, the Quance Mills or Sovereign-Quance Mills. At the time, the primary crops in the area were still fruit and vegetables.

Until 2001, Delhi was located within the Township of Delhi, a municipal government within the Regional Municipality of Haldimand-Norfolk. Prior to the amalgamation of Norfolk County, the population of the former Township of Delhi was 16,365 in the Canada 2001 Census Part of the agricultural heritage of Delhi included tobacco cultivation. The town has a tobacco museum to commemorate this part of its history. Local farms rely in part upon Jamaican and Mexican workers, who usually arrive around mid-to-late April and return to their homelands around early-to-mid November.

North Creek was once the most important spawning point for the local fish species until it was dammed in 1965. Local fishermen in addition to avid enthusiasts from the region historically fished near the now highly regulated tributaries during the 1940s and 1950s. Today, Big Creek is the main attraction for fishers of all ages.

As of 2016, the majority of Delhi's residents speak English as a first language and were born in Canada. Females outnumber males, and working-age people outnumber children and elderly people. Delhi will experience a surge in old age pensioners by the year 2026. Seventy people were born in the United States of America, while 250 were born in Europe. Ten residents were born in Africa, while 20 residents were born in Asia. Delhi's population is expected to grow to approximately 5,215 residents by 2056, although future wars and pandemics may affect this population growth. People are less likely to have children or emigrate to Canada if there are any major political/medical events happening in the world.

Dog's Nest
Dog's Nest is a community northeast of Port Dover along Highway 6. It has had its sign stolen 3 times and the municipality at the time decided not to put the sign back up. There is now a committee not for profit "DogsNest 1851" formed April 2019 to bring back the sign. They sell t-shirts, hats and merch to raise funds. 100% volunteer driven and 100% proceeds go towards the sign and surrounding area needs.

Fishers Glen
Fishers Glen is a fishing community that is south of Simcoe and southwest of Port Ryerse. It is considered to be a part of Norfolk County. Fishers Glen is famous among locals for being one of the best fishing spots in Lake Erie during the summer months.

Frogmore
Frogmore is a hamlet that is situated on the junction of Norfolk County Roads 45 and 28. It is located northwest of Valley Heights Secondary School. Agriculture is the predominant industry while commercial business ventures are non-existent. It is one of the westernmost communities in Norfolk County.

This community has a sizeable population of German Mennonites and Mexican Mennonites. Only six wind turbines, carrying approximately 9 MW of electricity have been placed in the vicinity. No more can be built in this area due to a county-wide ban on wind turbines passed in 2013. Even without the threat of wind turbines, this community is completely shielded from urban development threats due to its isolation from major communities like Simcoe, Delhi, and Tillsonburg.

The popular tourist destination of Port Burwell is just a 30 minutes' drive to the southwest of this community. Another historic community, Sparta, along with the St. Thomas Raceway Park lies 45 minutes to the southwest from Frogmore.

Gilbertville
Gilbertville is a hamlet in Norfolk County that is located between Pine Grove and Delhi. The local economy is founded on agriculture, which produces potatoes, onions, and asparagus, among other vegetables. Commerce in Gilbertville includes a tractor shop and an auto repair shop. There is a conservation park to the west of the hamlet. For administrative purposes and municipal elections, Gilbertville is considered to be the southernmost community in the third ward of Norfolk County.

Glenshee
Glenshee is a hamlet that is located west of Pinegrove in Norfolk County. The hamlet is mostly agricultural and residential. In addition to farms, there is also a machine shop that serves the local residents. The population is under 20 people and the nearest commerce is in Tillsonburg and Delhi.

Glenshee also has an abandoned cemetery that is also known as the Bigcraft Family Cemetery; because it originally held the tombstones for the relatives of the Bigcraft family in addition to close family friends and their in-laws. At least 7 individuals are known to be buried there.

School children here attend either Delhi Public School or Walsh Public School for their elementary/junior high school needs. To the southwest is the village of Silver Hill where the nearest car mechanic is based. Terrestrial television and satellite television (either through Bell Satellite TV or Shaw Direct) are the only ways to acquire television service because there is no cable television service in Glenshee.

Green's Corners
Green's Corners is a hamlet in Norfolk County that is located west of Simcoe, north of Walsh, southeast of Delhi, and east of Pine Grove. The population of Green's Corners is less than 50 people. In addition to residential property, there is also agriculture and some commerce. There is a bakery, a bed and breakfast, an automobile garage, and a Christmas tree store. This hamlet was also the hometown of the late musician, Rick Danko of The Band, who enjoyed a remarkable career on and off the stage.

Halfway House Corners
Halfway House Corners is a hamlet in Norfolk County. It is considered to be south of Simcoe and northwest of Port Dover. The Halfway House was an inn that sat on the southwest corner of the intersection. The name was given because it was located exactly half the distance between Port Dover and Simcoe. Ontario Highway 24 is the main road and commerce in this community includes a bait shop and a recording studio.

Hillcrest

Hillcrest is a hamlet in Norfolk County that is in between Bill's Corners and the town of Simcoe. There is also a soccer field; which received a $15,000 stimulus package from the Simcoe Lions Club on April 7, 2013. Adult amateur leagues typically do not use this field; with the exception of the Western Ontario Soccer League.

During the winter months (late November through early April), Hillcrest becomes a haven for snowmobile users. Religious needs for this community are provided either by the Simcoe United Church or the nearby Kingdom Hall for Jehovah's Witnesses (although non-members are welcome as pupils for weekly service).

The hamlet and all land that is within  to the south are considered to be prime land by local developers; they believe that land should be earmarked for the further expansion of Simcoe. Hillcrest may cease to exist as a separate community and become a "neighborhood" of Simcoe by the middle of the 21st century. With the recent growth in new housing activity, the area may need to overhaul its water and sewer systems to meet the needs of a rising and aging population of the next several decades. Lands not being used by tobacco farmers either get converted into prime commercial land, prime residential land or get their tobacco crops replaced with other products. A grand total of 991 new low-density houses will have to be built to accommodate the new people.

The new buildings could be "layered" over top of the old buildings; turning houses into makeshift apartment buildings and small stores into multi-floor shopping plazas. Alternate plans may include absorbing Renton, Port Dover and/or Waterford. Municipal planners will have to take into consideration the needs of the Oakwood Cemetery to expand as the current aging population begins to die in massive numbers.

Houghton
Houghton is a former township in Norfolk County. Its township seat was Fairground, a small village today. It is located in the southwest of Norfolk, bordering on the former Norfolk townships of Middleton to the northeast, and North and South Walsingham to the east. Fairground is a small community in Norfolk County, Ontario, Canada where the Norfolk County Fair and Horse Show took place in the early 19th century.

Until that event was moved to Simcoe, this was the spot where fairgoers attended the attractions and farmers displayed their best produce. The community of Fairground borders on the municipality of Bayham in Elgin County to the west, and its southern border is the Lake Erie shoreline, with no natural harbours. Rising gas prices and pervasive poverty amongst residents prevent many young Houghton residents from going to the Norfolk County Fair near downtown Simcoe; creating a need for a more local fair that lasted since 1853.

The township was part of Norfolk Township in Regional Municipality of Haldimand-Norfolk from 1974 to 2000. Agriculture dominates as the main industry and there is an elementary school called Houghton Public School in Fairground that serves children from kindergarten through eighth grade. Many families in the region had made Houghton their home since the late 1840s.

Jacksonburg
Jacksonburg

Langton

Langton is a small town located in Norfolk County; formerly known as Boughner's Corner.

The town can be accessed by travelling to the intersection just slightly to the west of Courtland and turning south on Ontario provincial Highway 59 if coming from Delhi, south if coming from Tillsonburg or if travelling eastbound on Ontario Provincial Highway 3, and straight ahead if travelling southbound using Ontario provincial Highway 59.

Langton once had two banks but the CIBC bank closed in May 2016 due to increased online banking activity and the changing Canadian economy; placing the future of offline banking in this community in definite jeopardy. Despite its small population, Langton was considered to be a banking hub for the tobacco farmers during the 20th century.

The Langton Baptist Churchyard is the local cemetery in the area. Having a significant amount of history to it, there are at least 600 individuals who are buried in the cemetery; including people with the last name Boughner because of its closeness to the community of Walsh. The oldest female buried at this cemetery is Rebecca Boughner (who died in 1863) while the oldest male buried in this cemetery is James N. Martin (who died in 1865). There are at least 5 members of the Millennials generation (born between 1980 and 2005) who are buried at this cemetery.

Sidewalks exist only on the main street, otherwise, walking in this town is very simple. The entire town spans 5 kilometers in length. Langton enjoys scenery that is very rural and flat. Streets can be busy sometimes; especially during the weekdays. Possible activities include hiking, walking, running, and cycling.

They have been able to receive cable television service since approximately 2011.

Since children of elementary school age who live in Andy's Corners attend Langton Public School or Sacred Heart School, Andy's Corners is considered to be a subdivision of Langton. Langton was home to the Langton Thunderbirds, a junior hockey team that played in the Southern Ontario Junior Hockey League. Langton has two schools: Langton Public School and Sacred Heart Catholic School.

La Salette

La Salette is a hamlet that is north of Delhi in Norfolk County, Ontario, Canada. La Salette is southwest of Brantford in nearby Brant County and northwest of Simcoe. Agriculture is the main industry and commerce is extremely limited. Most of the houses in La Salette are over 100 years old and the population of La Salette is less than 100 people.

Long Point

Long Point is a sand spit and medium-sized hamlet on the north shore of Lake Erie, part of Norfolk County.

Lake Erie lies to the south of Long Point, and the waters to the north side comprise Long Point Bay. The bay is subdivided into the Inner Bay and Outer Bay by a line that runs between Turkey Point to the north and Pottahawk Point to the south. Some of the towns along the bay's north shore include Port Rowan, Turkey Point and Port Dover. Long Point is north and across the lake from Erie, Pennsylvania.

Settlers from Europe began arriving in this area in 1790. After the American Revolution, many Loyalists began to settle here but after 1796, land was given to anyone who was capable of developing it. The first lighthouse was built in 1830.

In the 19th century, a powerful storm cut an opening through the middle of Long Point. A lighthouse was built alongside the channel, which was the first of several on the point. The opening became known as "The Old Cut". The cut has since closed along the lakeshore, but boaters continue to use the northern portion to access the bay, homes and cottages.

During the mid-19th century, some of the local residents saw an opportunity to make easy money by "blackbirding." Blackbirders erected fake lighthouses during times of low visibility. Ships trying to enter the old cut would run aground. When the crew abandoned ship the blackbirders would loot the ship of cargo and other valuables. With law enforcement based in London, Ontario, these blackbirders would store their loot on the many hiding spots that Long Point offered.

Abigail Becker on several occasions in the 19th century waded into stormy waters to save crew members of boats that had run aground. Long Point has caused many shipwrecks, with many of wrecks are right off the tip of the point. More than 400 ships have sunk in an area called "The Lake Erie Quadrangle".

Sport hunting was important after the Long Point Company purchased the Point in 1866 to facilitate this pursuit. Long Point Provincial Park was created in May 1921; by 1929, it was connected to the mainland by a new causeway.

Lynedoch
Lynedoch is a hamlet in Norfolk County which was named after Baron Lynedoch who served under Wellington during the Napoleonic Wars.

During the 19th century, this hamlet had a post office, a school, a tailor, blacksmith, taverns, hotels, and churches. A church has been restored in the area and is being used for outdoor weddings and private receptions.

Dennis' Horseradish is produced a short distance east of the settlement.

By 2021, Lynedoch will gain access to high-speed Internet.

The village consists of elderly people on old age pensions in addition to a marginal amount of young married couples who wish to become homeowners. There is also a community group which is non-profit and consists mostly of people who live in the Lynedoch area. It is located northwest of Pine Grove, southwest of Delhi, and west of Simcoe.

N–Z

Nixon

Nixon is a hamlet in Norfolk County, Ontario, Canada that is almost exclusively residential. There is an airfield, some farms, and a single office building that is dedicated to an agriculture-related business in the hamlet where Nixon Public School used to be. Nixon is east of the town of Delhi, northwest of the town of Simcoe, and northeast of the hamlet of Pinegrove.

Plans are currently underway for a microbrewery to open in the community; beers and wines that emulate those found in Belgium and the Netherlands will be manufactured here. Producing very little noise or steam pollution, the microbrewery will bolster the economy of Norfolk County. Trappist beers will be brewed on site for the purpose of getting the higher-class members of Norfolk County to spend money more locally. The municipal government approved the rezoning of the surrounding land to "light industrial" for Norfolk County's third microbrewery to be possible according to the local by-laws. This community is the westernmost community to receive water from the Lynn River; which flows directly into Lake Erie. Beers and wines produced in the Nixon microbrewery will use the Lynn River as a source of their water.

Normandale
Normandale is a quaint fishing town in southwestern Norfolk County that is famous for its perch and black bass. This settlement was part of Charlotteville where Fort Norfolk was built in 1813 with accommodation for 300 troops. A large iron foundry, the Normandale Furnace and Ironworks was built here in 1817 and was expanded in 1822; it made farm implements, the well-known Van Norman stoves as well as kettles, pots, and pans but closed down in 1847 or 1850.

Commerce is extremely limited now and agriculture plays a smaller role than in other parts of Norfolk County.

Normandale has a historical cemetery located on Spooky Hollow Road which has at least 288 individuals buried there.

Pinegrove

Prior to the late 1970s, much of Pine Grove was agricultural land owned by the Adcock family. After the family patriarch died circa 1978, the land was distributed amongst his sons and the first housing boom in Pine Grove occurred. Three-quarters of present-day Pine Grove were completed by the mid-1980s. In the 1980s, children needing special education attended Nixon Public School and North Public School. Both of these schools are defunct and are no longer operating as of 2007. Starting in 1991, they could attend Walsh Public School under their special education program. Sidewalks were never built to attract people to this hamlet with low property taxes. No further construction was done in Pine Grove until . While the weak Canadian dollar and low interest rates brought in 3 new single-family homes to the recently formed cul-de-sac of Woodland Drive, expansion has been slowed down by the rising interest rates and a strengthening Canadian dollar – construction of a fourth single-family home only started circa October 2007.

A defunct Baptist church and cemetery can be found in Pine Grove. Although the original grave markers remain and can be publicly viewed, the former church building is now a private residence. Entering the residence without an invitation will result in criminal trespassing charges and prosecution. The defunct cemetery is located in between the gas station and the car repair shop. The grave markers are remarkably old and date back to the 19th century. Shortly after Norfolk County became a single tier municipality, the location of the cemetery was given the distinctive green Norfolk County sign for historical sites and parks.

The gas station was once owned by a local couple and has serviced the area for decades. They briefly brought in a miniature video arcade to the convenience store part prior to 1982. However, it was removed when the locals found it to be too noisy. After the husband died in the mid-1990s, his widow operated the store until her death sometime prior to the year 2004. The gas station was eventually sold to a couple from Toronto who eventually sold it to someone else years later. In addition to gasoline and food, the convenience store also provides lottery tickets and offers a large selection of products within a small space.

On June 4, 2007, a series of blackouts affected Pine Grove that was caused by a transformer that was on fire. The first one was from approximately 11:00 A.M. to 11:30 A.M which forced the Norfolk County Fire Department to arrive to the scene without having to close Regional Road 1. Even though the fire was extinguished and the transformer was patched, the patch was only temporary as the fire eventually resumed almost 7 hours later at approximately 7:00 pm. This caused another blackout that lasted until approximately 11:00 pm. This blackout however did not affect Green's Corners, Hillcrest, or Simcoe. Ontario Hydro crews worked on replacing the transformer without the Ontario Provincial Police having to close down Regional Road 1. The total blackout period for the day was approximately 4 hours and 30 minutes (270 minutes).

Port Dover

In 1670, French missionaries François Dollier de Casson and René Bréhant de Galinée became the first Europeans to winter at what is now Port Dover. Earthen remains and a plaque marks the spot near the fork of the Lynn River (Patterson's Creek to many of the older Port Doverites) and Black Creek where they and seven Frenchmen (the first Europeans known to have ascended the Great Lakes to Sault Ste. Marie) built a hut and chapel. Just outside the community, a cross with the arms of France had been erected on 23 March 1670, claiming the area for King Louis XIV over the Lake Erie region.

By 1794 the first settlers, a group of United Empire Loyalists, had established a hamlet known as Dover Mills (named for the English port of Dover) which was razed to the ground by the Americans in the War of 1812. During the war, in August 1812, Major General Isaac Brock gathered a force of about regulars and militia here. Using boats on the lake, they reached Amherstburg (also in Upper Canada) and then attacked and captured the American Hull's Army at Detroit.

Subsequent reconstruction took place closer to the mouth of the Lynn River, where a harbour had been in use since the early 19th century. In 1835, merchant Israel Wood Powell registered a village plan for Port Dover. By 1842, the village was growing and had a population of almost 400. The harbor, lighthouse, and bridge across the river had been completed as had the road to Hamilton; there was a grammar school, a grist mill, a sawmill and a Presbyterian church in the course of construction. Improvement to the harbour during the next fifteen years made Port Dover a principal Lake Erie port. Shipyards, tanneries, and Andrew Thompson's woolen-mill contributed substantially to local economic growth.

In 1877, Port Dover was a large village with 1,100 residents, most living on the west bank of the River Lynn. The village was served by the Port Dover & Lake Huron Railway and a more substantial harbor had been completed. Records indicate that businesses include a foundry, many stores, a newspaper, wagon and carriage makers, and a busy school house. Port Dover became an incorporated village in 1879.

Fishing became a major industry in the 20th century and Port Dover also became a tourist destination. Port Dover's fishing industry at one time hosted the largest freshwater fishing fleet in the world that employed many of the town's citizens and continues to be important to the community. From 1906 to 1993, the town was home to Thomas A. Ivey and Sons, one of Canada's largest wholesale florists and rose-growers, and Port Dover's largest employer. In 1974, Port Dover was incorporated as Ward 2 of the former city of Nanticoke.

In the summer, Port Dover is busy with thousands of tourists who come to swim in Lake Erie and enjoy the town and surrounding area. Port Dover's business district is dominated by small shops that cater to the tourist trade with many bars and restaurants that depend largely on the increased traffic during the summer months. One of the most traditional businesses is The Arbor that sells cherry glows instead of soft drinks and hot dogs served on thick pieces of hot dogs buns in addition to French fries.

The Port Dover Yacht Club has occupied land purchased from W.F. Kolbe and Co. at the fork of the Lynn River and Black Creek since September 1938. The P.D.Y.C. welcomes visitors every summer from around the Great Lakes region and beyond.

Port Dover has celebrated Canada Day with a parade every year since July 1867. The day starts off with the annual Soap-box Derby, the Boat Parade at the harbour, a Calithumpian Parade down Main Street and a fireworks display after dark.

Since 1981, there has been a tradition of motorcycle enthusiasts gathering in the town for Friday the 13th. Chris Simons and approximately 25 friends, through word of mouth, got together at the old Commercial Hotel. It was in November and it was Friday the 13th. They decided they should do it every Friday the 13th. On June 13, 2008, an estimated 150,000 bikers and spectators converged on Port Dover for Friday the 13th.

Port Rowan

Port Rowan holds an annual Bayfest every Labour Day; this used to be known as "Tomato Fest" but was renamed a few years ago. Local sports include angling and boating in the Long Point Inner Bay. Bird Studies Canada is based at Port Rowan.

In 1845, Port Rowan was very small, with only 50 residents but had a store, tavern, post office and
a collector of customs who worked with the shipping trade. Lumber became important between 1845 and 1850 so the population increased to 100 by 1845 and to 200 by 1850.

By 1877, Port Rowan had about 1,000 residents, many living in beautiful homes overlooking the lake. It was a successful commercial and industrial centre for those who lived in the general area. Fishing had also started and would continue through the 1900s. The village had three churches, a public hall, a
Masonic Hall and a Temperance Hall.

A state of the art water treatment plant was built in 2011, which assures future growth capacity in the town along with its rapidly aging population. There are wind generators in the Port Rowan area; which stretch out to Clear Creek and the Elgin County line. This community is the westernmost and the southernmost to participate in the Southern Ontario's Green Energy Hub.

Located just outside of town off Lakeshore Rd. is the famous Backus Mill, where every year there is a re-enactment of the War of 1812. This site was the location of a grain mill built by John Backhouse in the 1790s and was powered by water. The mill's mechanism was upgraded later in the 1800 and then in the early 1900s.

Port Ryerse

Port Ryerse is a fishing hamlet in Norfolk County just slightly southwest of Port Dover where people from Southwestern Ontario rent cottages and fish for pleasure during the summer months (Victoria Day through mid-October). The hamlet was founded by Lieut-Colonel Samuel Ryerse, brother of Colonel Joseph Ryerson and uncle of Egerton Ryerson. Its harbor was important for shipping cargo from Norfolk County across the lake.

Samuel Ryerse was a United Empire Loyalist who fought with the British during the American Revolution and came to Upper Canada in 1794 where he received 3000 acres of land. He built a grist mill at the mouth of Young's Creek and a settlement grew up around it. Ryerse remained involved with the military as Lieutenant of the County of Norfolk and was also the chairman of the Court of Quarter Sessions.

The mill was burned by American troops in 1814 during the War of 1812. In later years, two new gristmills were built at the same location but both burned down (in 1860 and in 1890). A brick schoolhouse was built in 1871.

The Memorial Anglican Church Cemetery is located in the hamlet; with at least 26 individuals or families buried here. The cemetery contains tombstones from the 19th century and carries traditional British surnames like Fletcher, Lawrence, Ryerse, Sells, and Stalker. The most recent burial in the Memorial Anglican Church Cemetery happens to be of Miss Sarah Fletcher; who died in 1880.

Many of the residents live here year-round. Most of the people here drive to Port Dover or Simcoe to purchase groceries and other goods, although there was a historic general store until September 2004, when it burned down. Handmade soap and bath shop and folk art shop still exist in the community. Port Ryerse is also the birthplace of John Edward Brownlee, who was the Premier of the province of Alberta during the roaring twenties and through the early years of the Great Depression.

A public elementary school called Port Ryerse School was located here that was in operation from the 19th century to the 1950s.

Rattlesnake Harbour
Rattlesnake Harbour is a hamlet in Norfolk County that is located north of Nixon. Despite the name, there is no harbour in Rattlesnake Harbour and agriculture is the main industry – not fishing. Rattlesnakes can be found among the wilderness, giving the name the same appeal to locals as Frogmore to the distant southwest.

Renton
Renton is a hamlet in Norfolk County that is between Simcoe and Jarvis in Haldimand County. There was a truckers' diner (which burnt down in the spring of 2010) and there is also a golf course in the vicinity. Agriculture is the main industry and the population has remained stagnant over the past 20 years.

To the north is the town of Boston. Simcoe lies to the west, Townsend is to the northeast, while Jarvis is to the east.

Rhineland
Rhineland is a hamlet in Norfolk County that has agriculture as the main industry. Commerce is absent and the hamlet has a church and rural housing. While tobacco is the crop of choice, lavender is being experimented as a possible replacement crop for the region. The program began as a government pilot program in 2003 and is providing a chance for a "one-industry area" to diversify into other industries to acclimatize itself into a changing global economy.

It is located northwest of Lynedoch and Pine Grove. The name comes from the original German settlers who came to this land in the 19th century. It is also located southeast of Tillsonburg where the closest shopping mall for Rhineland residents can be found. Children here go to Delhi District Secondary School or Valley Heights Secondary School for their high school education and elementary school children go to Delhi Public School or Courtland Public School.

Rockford
Rockford is a hamlet in Norfolk County that is located between Waterford and Hagersville. It used to have a church, general store and a baseball team. Now it is made up of farms and a few houses.

Silver Hill
Silver Hill is a hamlet that is southwest of Pine Grove and southeast of Tillsonburg. The main industry is agriculture. There is also an automobile repair shop and a residential district of houses and farms. The population of Silver Hill, Ontario is less than 100. To the south is Turkey Point and Lake Erie which leads to Pennsylvania in the United States of America. Students here go to Walsh Public School for grades kindergarten to eighth grade and Valley Heights Secondary School for their high school education.

Simcoe

Simcoe is the administrative centre of Norfolk County, with a population of 16,000 making it Norfolk's largest community. Simcoe is located at the junction of Highway 3, at Highway 24, due south of Brantford, Ontario, and accessible to Hamilton by nearby Highway 6. The town is northwest of Nanticoke in Haldimand County.

Simcoe was founded in 1795 by lieutenant governor John Graves Simcoe. Initially, the settlement consisted of two distinct areas, Birdtown, named by William Bird who arrived in the early 1800s and the Queensway which grew up around Aron Culver's sawmill and grist mill in the 1820s. The post office opened in 1829 and was called Simcoe. In 1837, the village became the seat of government of the then Talbot District.

Records from 1846 indicate that the settlement was far from any major roads and had little communication with areas outside of Brantford. A stone courthouse and jail had already been built. There were three churches, Methodist, Baptist, and Congregationalist and a weekly newspaper for the population of about 1,400. The post office was receiving mail daily. Already operating were two grist-mills, two sawmills, a brewery, two distilleries, a foundry, a fulling mill, nine stores, six taverns, two druggists, a bank (Gore) and many tradesmen.

The population in 1850 was about 1600; in that year, Simcoe became the County seat of Norfolk County. Simcoe was incorporated as a town in 1878 and had its own town council and mayor until December 31, 2000. In 2001, the town and all other municipalities within the Regional Municipality of Haldimand-Norfolk were dissolved and the region was divided into two single tier municipalities with city-status but called counties. Simcoe now forms Ward 5 of Norfolk County.

The town hosts the Lynn River Music and Arts Festival, the Norfolk County Fair and Horse Show, and a Christmas Panorama of Lights. As of 2019, Crystal Lake (along with Wellington Park that surrounds it) was the most ideal place for bird watching in Simcoe. At least 83 bird species had been discovered there between 1971 and 2019; including the Osprey, the Belted Kingfisher, and the Common Nighthawk.

Most people choose to retire in Simcoe if they cannot afford to retire in Port Dover. Able-bodied young people who choose to stay in Simcoe either have some form of part-time employment or a full-time service job such as a doctor, lawyer or vehicle repairman.

There is an organization called NACL (Norfolk Association for Community Living) that helps mentally disabled people to become prosperous in their own community. People with autism or Down syndrome cannot go to store by themselves because Simcoe is a car-friendly community and most of them can't walk the street by themselves. They are usually seen with a parent, guardian, supervisor, or social worker. Mentally disabled people will always be supervised while exploring Simcoe's "dangerous" streets.

St. Williams

St. Williams is a small hamlet and fishing community in Norfolk County. The lakeside community is located 30 minutes south of Pinegrove. St. Williams is about 30 minutes from both Simcoe and Tillsonburg. It is a village with a population of approximately 400 people.

Backus Mill is located close by and it is popularized as being one of the only mills left standing after the War of 1812.

Tourists can enjoy Backus, just outside St. Williams on the way to Port Rowan, all year round with hiking, sledding, camping and discovering the history of the mill. A railroad line once passed through St. Williams but was decommissioned in the 1990s. Their public school was closed in the early first decade of the 21st century and their grocery store became a mini-mart. There was also an old folks' home that was shut down and the old fire hall that is an antiquated building in St. Williams.

Summer vacation properties are seen on the southern end of the main street after winding down the hill. A modest beach is located near the vacation houses along with a pier for docking small boats. Swimming is possible from July to early September. By the year 2020, St. Williams will experience cable television and Internet speeds that are roughly comparable to Delhi's Internet speeds thanks to an underground cable system that will hook up communities like Langton, Port Rowan and Courtland into the world of reliable broadband Internet.

Teeterville

Teeterville is a hamlet southwest of Vanessa. The main attraction of this town is the Teeterville Pioneer Museum. Agriculture is the main industry and commerce is very limited. There is also a public elementary school in the hamlet.

The Teeterville Pioneer Museum is a museum devoted to pioneer life in the 19th century. It includes antique farm equipment as well as home and garden tools.

Turkey Point
Turkey Point is a village in the former township of Charlotteville in what is now Norfolk County, Ontario. It is located on Long Point Bay south of Highway 24 on Regional Road 10, southwest of Simcoe. The village is also home to MacDonald Turkey Point Marina.

This community is referenced in the Three Dead Trolls in a Baggie song which was titled "The Toronto Song" as being terrible along with Sarnia.

John Graves Simcoe visited this area in 1795 and suggested that a settlement be laid out. Settlement began soon after that, and by 1800, law courts were being held here.

Vittoria

Vittoria is a small village east of Walsh and southwest of Simcoe in Norfolk County. Noted today for being one of the most historic communities in Norfolk County it has a fire station, a community hall, a town hall, and three active churches. Built during the early to mid-1800s, the community was a vital hub, serving as the capital of the London District of Upper Canada from 1815 to 1825. The Courts of the London district were located here before moving to Simcoe.

This area was part of the original Charlotteville Township which prospered from the outset. Vittoria was its largest village, and for many years was a place of much importance. The courts of the London district were held there for eleven years, and the registry office was also at Vittoria for many years, preceding its removal to Simcoe.
 All the traditional pioneer establishments, such as grist and saw mills, were built. The main street boasted two hotels, several stores, a bake shop, a school, as well as one of the first post offices in Upper Canada. Later, as technology changed, a train station was built along with a number of different factories such as a canning and cheese establishment.

The Catherwood and the Kiln is a moderately expensive pizza restaurant that is popular among locals. Other items on the menu include subs, panzerottis, chicken caesar salads, mozzarella sticks. The toppings are typically of excellent quality and people attend this establishment year round.

Vittoria Baptist Cemetery is located on Charlotteville Road; having the distinction of being a United Empire Loyalists burial ground and containing the remains of at least 532 people. This cemetery has existed since 1804.

This settlement was the birthplace of Egerton Ryerson (in 1803) a Methodist minister. Between 1844 and 1876, he was the chief superintendent of education for Upper Canada and was responsible for developing Upper Canada's education system.

Today the village, hidden off the main tourist routes, is a treasure trove for historians. Its architecture, setting, and untouched feeling provide a glimpse into what rural Upper Canada was once like. Many private and public buildings have been historically designated including the Baptist Church established in 1804, and the Vittoria Town Hall built in 1870. In addition, it is home to historic Christ Church Anglican, built in 1844, one of the most important frame churches still in existence in Ontario, remaining largely unchanged since its construction.

The village's name refers to the 1813 victory of the Duke of Wellington at the Battle of Vittoria in Spain.

Walsh

Walsh, formerly known as Charlotteville Centre, is a medium-sized hamlet in Norfolk County that is home to Walsh Public School in the Grand Erie District School Board and St. Michael's Catholic Elementary School.

Since Walsh Public School is a rural school, farming is considered to be the primary source of income for most of the local families. Either one parent or both parents is usually employed in a workplace that is dependent on the local agriculture industry. While the grade 3 students are good readers at Walsh Public School, the grade 6 students perform equally well at reading and writing. Both the grade 3 and grade 6 students show a universal weakness in mathematics. Female students have a slight advantage over the male students when to comes to reading and math.

It has the buried remains of at least 133 individuals or families. Common last names of people buried at the Walsh Baptist Cemetery include Atkinson, Bingleman, Bint, Bye, Cope, Ferris, Pepper, and Shepherd. There is only one member of the Millennials generation that is buried at Walsh Baptist Cemetery.

Walsh's other cemetery is the Walsh United Church Cemetery. It has at least 533 individuals and/or families buried there and it was established around 1830. People buried there were typically born between the late-19th century to the mid-20th century. Common last names found at the Walsh United Cemetery are Armstong, Anderson, Barker, Becker, Bingleman, and Boughner. There are at least four members of the Millennials generation (born between 1980 and 2005) that are buried at Walsh United Church Cemetery.

An annual fair held in the hamlet called the Donnybrook Fair attracts kids and adults from the area in the middle of September.

It has been held since 1857, with the fair growing in size and quality every year. Children who attend school within the immediate vicinity are allowed to enter any artwork that they produced themselves in addition to their own crafts and agriculture-related artifacts. They are typically between the ages of 5 and 13. Homeschooled children may also enter the contests. In the 2011 edition of the Donnybrook Fair, these local students have managed to win $1346 in tax-free cash. This monetary award encourages children to save up for higher education opportunities. The short-term effects of the award system encourages children to work on their innovative spirit and improve their work ethics. Although the winner of the Donnybrook Fair demolition derby is no longer assured a spot in the Norfolk County Fair version of the event, the prize money keeps increasing and the event is done over a traditional dirt track. Fundraising for the Donnybrook Fair involves a Victoria Day brunch, an annual spring barbecue, and numerous raffles.

Walsingham
Walsingham is a hamlet in Norfolk County that is located south of Valley Heights Secondary School. Very close to this settlement, the land was purchased from the Mississauga First Nation and some families settled there by 1791. Others, including Loyalists who had fought in the American Revolution, arrived later at the so-called Long Point Settlement. The area was heavily treed and was important in the lumber industry until it closed in about 1878.

The farms and mills that had been built here were extensively damaged in 1814, during the War of 1812. Everything was rebuilt and the community was doing well by 1825.

Agriculture is the main industry and commerce is extremely limited. Mennonites from this region attend Valley Heights Secondary School as it is located close to their parents' farmland and provides them with the innovative tools they need to enhance their experience in the agricultural industry.

Waterford

Waterford sits on the old Canada Southern Railroad, preceding various other rail company takeovers, the latest of which was by CN/CP. The now idle line passes through Ontario between Buffalo, New York and Detroit, Michigan. An electric railroad once operated in Waterford; the official fare from Galt to Waterford was a mere $1.05 ($ in today's money) while taking it to nearby Simcoe cost $1.25 plus taxes ($ in today's money).

Established in 1794, this community was first established as a saw and grist mill community. by Paul Averill in 1800. It was called Sayles' Mills, Sovereign's Mills, Lodersville; the name was changed to Waterford when a post-office opened around 1826. Waterford became the northernmost marketplace in Norfolk County; complementing Simcoe as its center marketplace. The village would become incorporated in 1878 when its population reached 1100 people.

In the early 1800s, this area was important in the lumber industry and also had many successful farms. The first settler was Job Slaght who also built the first grist mill. James L. Green who owned much of the village built a foundry that manufactured farm implements. Job Loder built the Finch mill and the old Gustin mill east of Vittoria as well as a sawmill. By 1851, Waterford contained the township hall and many industries, including a large agricultural implements factory built by James Green. The railway arrived in 1871 and helped increase growth, to 1,100 people by the time the village was incorporated in 1871.

Organized hockey in Waterford dates back to the early 1900s; where the first amateur adult team formed for the purpose of allowing Waterford residents to play the sport.

Wilsonville
Wilsonville is a hamlet in Norfolk County that is north of Waterford. It is considered to be the northernmost community in the Ontario tobacco belt. The main industry is agriculture and the housing also serves as a bedroom community to the town of Waterford to the south. Children from this community either attend Boston Public School for primary grades, followed by Waterford District High School or St. Bernard's of Clairvaux School for primary grades, followed by Holy Trinity Catholic High School in Simcoe.

The local farmers here specialize in tobacco and pumpkins (used in Waterford's Pumpkinfest every October). Since the closure of the General Store in the early 2000s, Wilsonville has not had a retail business in town. Residents commute to nearby communities in Norfolk County to go shopping, or travel north to communities in Brant County and the city of Brantford. The family name of the first settlers was Wilson – similar to the concept of the Gilbert family naming the town of Gilbertville after their surname.

Wilsonville became the first community in Norfolk County to receive high-speed Internet services and television through fibre optic cables in 2017.

Wyecombe
Wyecombe is a small hamlet located on the intersection of East Quarter Line Road and County Road 21. Wyecombe is home to a quiet subdivision of approximately 25 houses and a local auto repair shop. The nearest elementary school is Langton Public School or Sacred Heart and the nearest high school is Valley Heights Secondary School.

References